The Mauritius grey white-eye (Zosterops mauritianus) is a species of bird in the family Zosteropidae. It is one of two white-eye species endemic to the island of Mauritius, the other being the rare and localized Mauritius olive white-eye. It inhabits woodlands, forests, and gardens.  The Réunion grey white-eye is very closely related. They were formerly considered conspecific and together called Mascarene white-eye.

Gallery

Birds described in 1789
Taxa named by Johann Friedrich Gmelin
Birds of Mauritius
Zosterops
Endemic fauna of Mauritius